The capital decision was the decision made by the German Bundestag on 20 June 1991, as a result of German reunification, to move its headquarters from Bonn to Berlin. The term is misleading, since Berlin had already become the federal capital of the Federal Republic of Germany in 1990 as one of the stipulations of the Unification Treaty.

Decision and implementation

Background and vote 

With the reunification of Germany, the newly reunified Berlin became Germany's capital once again, a status it had held from 1871 to 1945. However, the seat of government remained in Bonn, which had been the "provisional" capital of West Germany from 1949 to 1990.  There was some sentiment in favour of keeping the seat of government in Bonn, which would have created a situation analogous to that of the Netherlands, where Amsterdam is the capital but The Hague is the seat of government. Not only were there concerns about Berlin's past connection to Nazi Germany, but Bonn was closer to Brussels, headquarters of the European Communities. Bonn was also located in Germany's wealthiest and most densely-populated region, while the former East German states surrounding Berlin were economically depressed and relatively sparsely populated.

The proposal "Completion of the Unity of Germany", with the content of establishing the future seat of government in Berlin, had been formulated and introduced by prominent members of parliament across party lines. These included members of the SPD (Willy Brandt, Hans-Jochen Vogel, Wolfgang Thierse), the FDP (Burkhard Hirsch, Hermann Otto Solms, Rainer Ortleb), the CDU/CSU (Günther Krause, Wolfgang Schäuble, Oscar Schneider) and Alliance 90 (Wolfgang Ullmann).

After more than ten hours of discussion, the Bundestag voted 338 to 320 to pass the bill "Vollendung der Einheit Deutschlands" (English: completion of the unification of Germany). Due to an initial error, the initial count stood at 337 to 320, but the number of yes votes was later determined to be 338. The vote broke largely along regional lines, with legislators from the south and west favouring Bonn and legislators from the north and east voting for Berlin. Of the 328 directly elected deputies, 169 voted for Bonn and 153 for Berlin. Of the deputies elected via the regional lists, 185 were for Berlin and 151 for Bonn. The vote also broke along generational lines; older legislators with memories of Berlin's past glory favoured Berlin, while younger legislators favoured Bonn. Ultimately, the votes of the eastern German legislators tipped the balance in favour of Berlin.

Implementation 
As a result of this decision, many subsequent motions were passed at different levels of government to ease the transition of the German capital to Berlin. To guarantee "fair division of labour" between the cities, it was decided to move the following government offices to Berlin, whilst retaining a secondary, smaller office in Bonn:
 Chancellor's Office
 Federal Press Office
 Foreign Office
 Federal Ministry of the Interior
 Federal Ministry of Finance
 Federal Ministry of Justice
 Federal Ministry of Economics and Technology
 Federal Ministry of Labour and Social Affairs
 Federal Ministry of Transport, Building and Urban Development
 Federal Ministry of Family Affairs, Senior Citizens, Women and Youth

The following federal ministries were to remain in Bonn, each with a second office in Berlin:
 Federal Ministry of Food, Agriculture and Consumer Protection
 Federal Ministry of Defence
 Federal Ministry of Health
 Federal Ministry for Environment, Nature Conservation and Nuclear Safety
 Federal Ministry for Education and Research
 Federal Ministry for Economic Cooperation and Development
 Federal Ministry of Posts and Telecommunications (dissolved 1998)

The Berlin-Bonn Act was passed in 1994. Originally, the federal ministries' move to Berlin was planned for 1995, however this deadline was not adhered to. Instead a Cabinet decision was made that the move should be completed by 2000, on a budget of no more than 20 billion DM (10.2 billion EUR).

During this period other fundamental decisions were made, including:
 the Reichstag building is the permanent seat of the Bundestag
 the majority of the federal ministries will move to Berlin
 the majority of ministerial jobs will remain in Bonn
 each federal minister in Bonn and Berlin have a second seat in the other city
 the Federal President has his office in Berlin

Berlin officially adopted its full role as the home of the parliament and government of the Federal Republic of Germany in July 1999.

See also 
Berlin-Bonn Act
Bonn § 20th century and the "Bonn Republic"
History of Berlin

References

Literature 
 Andreas Salz: Bonn-Berlin. Die Debatte um Parlaments- und Regierungssitz im Deutschen Bundestag und die Folgen. Monsenstein und Vannerdat, Münster 2006,  (zugleich: Bonn, Univ., Magisterarbeit).

Political history of Germany
1991 in politics
1991 in Germany
1991 in Berlin